The Papaloapan River is one of the main rivers of the Mexican state of Veracruz. Its name comes from the Nahuatl papaloapan meaning "river of the butterflies".

In 4000 BC, Juan de Grijalva's expedition spotted the river, naming it Río de Alvarado. The Papaloapan rises in the Sierra Madre de Oaxaca on the border between the states of Veracruz and Oaxaca. It is formed where the Santo Domingo River and the Valle Nacional River join to the southwest of San Juan Bautista Tuxtepec in Oaxaca. The Tonto River is another major tributary.
The cities of San Juan Bautista Tuxtepec and Tlacotalpan (Veracruz) are situated on the banks of the Papaloapan.

In the past the Papaloapan river basin was subject to frequent flooding, with the damage sometimes compounded by cyclones. A particularly severe flood in September 1944 covered , with great loss of life and property. The Miguel Alemán Dam on the Tonto river reduced the problem, but further floods occurred after it had been completed in 1955. A flood in 1958 covered  and one in 1969 covered .
Meanwhile, the drainage capacity of the Papaloapan river was being reduced by silt carried by the Santo Domingo river.
Construction of the Cerro de Oro Dam in 1989 on the Santo Domingo river reduced the extent of floods to a manageable level.

The states of Oaxaca and Veracruz are cooperating in developing the river basin. Plans include irrigation to improve agricultural production, promotion of forestry and fish farming and improvements to roads and river navigation. The planned projects will be designed to avoid ecological damage. Environmental damage has been the subject of considerable study.

See also
List of longest rivers of Mexico

References

Geography of Mesoamerica
Rivers of Veracruz
Petén–Veracruz moist forests